State Road 501 (NM 501) is a  state highway in New Mexico, United States of America. NM 501's western terminus is at NM 4 west of Los Alamos. It runs northeast into the town of Los Alamos, where it ends. It passes through the territory of Los Alamos National Laboratory (LANL), which is closed to the public (the public may drive through on NM 501). Guard posts are at either end of the LANL section of the highway, and motorists passing into (but not out of) LANL territory must pause at the posts and be waved through. Under most conditions, no inspections, etc., are performed at the guard posts, but heightened security postures at LANL may lead to more intrusive checks.

NM 501 is part of the Jemez Mountain Trail National Scenic Byway.  Note that the cited reference erroneously describes this segment as highway 502, not 501, in conflict with reference 1. NM 502 is a related but distinct highway that runs east from Los Alamos to a junction with NM 4 and then to the town of Pojoaque. NM 501 and NM 502 together were formerly known as "Business Route 4," as together they formed a business route through Los Alamos, which was bypassed by NM 4.

Major intersections

References

1501
501
Transportation in Los Alamos County, New Mexico